Sköllersta is a locality situated in Hallsberg Municipality, Örebro County, Sweden with 1,131 inhabitants in 2010. Sköllersta is located near the tripoint where the municipalities of Hallsberg, Kumla and Örebro meet.

Skyllersta Hundred, Skyllersta härad or Sköllersta härad, was a hundred of Närke in Sweden.

Riksdag elections

Sports
The following sports clubs are located in Sköllersta:

 Sköllersta IF

References 

Populated places in Örebro County
Populated places in Hallsberg Municipality